Rev. William Allen (4 November 1847 – 1919) was an English-born Australian Congregational clergyman.

Allen was born in Betchworth, Surrey, and was taken to Victoria in 1852. He was educated at the Scotch and Congregational colleges in Melbourne, and matriculated at the Melbourne University in 1869. He became pastor of the Sandhurst Congregational church in January 1871, was transferred to Maryborough in January 1876, and in January 1880 was appointed to his present living at Carlton. Since 1871 Mr. Allen has written for the religious press; he was Chairman of the "Congregational Union and Mission of Victoria" in 1886 and 1886, and in the latter year published "Random Rhymes." Mr. Allen gained the first prize for the cantata which he composed for the opening of the Melbourne Centennial Exhibition in 1888.

Allen was the father to Leslie Holdsworth Allen, the academic and poet, and Sir Carleton Allen, professor and Warden of Rhodes House, University of Oxford.

References

1847 births
1919 deaths
Australian Protestant ministers and clergy
English emigrants to colonial Australia